An artificial whitewater course (AWWC) is a site for whitewater canoeing, whitewater kayaking, whitewater racing, whitewater rafting, playboating and slalom canoeing with artificially generated rapids.

Course types
Main types of course:

Flow diversion
These work by diverting a natural river through boulder placement or damming, or by creating new channels next to an existing river, possibly by a weir or power station outflow.

Tidal action
Created in estuaries with large tidal reaches, on a barrage across the river. The barrage is opened during a rising high tide to allow the sea water in, then shut as the tide turns. The water stored above the barrage is then forced through an artificial channel to provide water features.

Pumped
The nature of artificial whitewater courses necessitates the need for a drop in the river, and enough water flow to provide hydraulics. When this isn't possible (often in flat low-lying areas), electric pumps are used to lift and re-circulate the water to the top of the course. The shapes of these courses are commonly circular or U-shaped.

Pumped courses are extremely expensive to run, typically 1-2 megawatts of electrical power are needed to pump 15 cubic metres per second of water down a course with a 5-meter drop in height.

Altered Riverbed 
These courses are created in existing natural river channels, but are enhanced with strategic placement of new rocks, boulders, or concrete structures. Some are downstream of river or channel wide dams and therefore have some level of flow optimization, others are subject to seasonal flows.

Olympic whitewater courses

 1972 - Augsburg Eiskanal in Augsburg, Germany — flow diversion
 1992 - Segre Olympic Park in La Seu d'Urgell, Spain — flow diversion/pumped
 1996 - Ocoee Whitewater Center near Copperhill, Tennessee, USA — altered riverbed
 2000 - Penrith Whitewater Stadium, near Sydney, Australia — pumped
 2004 - Hellinikon Olympic Canoe/Kayak Slalom Centre, Athens, Greece — pumped
 2008 - Shunyi Olympic Rowing-Canoeing Park, Beijing, China — pumped
 2012 - Lee Valley White Water Centre, London, England — pumped
 2016 - Deodoro Olympic Whitewater Stadium, Rio de Janeiro, Brazil — pumped
 2021 - Kasai Canoe Slalom Centre, Tokyo, Japan — pumped

Other notable courses
 Adventure Sports Center International in McHenry, Maryland, USA — pumped
 Canolfan Tryweryn near Bala, Gwynedd, North Wales — natural flow modifications
 Cardington Artificial Slalom Course near Bedford, England — flow diversion
 Dickerson Whitewater Course in Dickerson, Maryland, USA — pumped
 Dutch Water Dreams in Zoetermeer, Netherlands — pumped
 Holme Pierrepont in Nottingham, England — flow diversion
 U.S. National Whitewater Center, near Charlotte, North Carolina, USA — pumped
 Nene Whitewater Centre in Northampton, England — pumped
 Rutherford Creek in British Columbia, Canada — flow diversion
 Tacen Whitewater Course near Ljubljana, Slovenia — flow diversion
 Tees Barrage International White Water Course in Stockton-on-Tees, England — converted from tidal to pumped in 2010/2011
 Čunovo Water Sports Centre near Čunovo, Slovakia — flow diversion
 Canal de aguas bravas, Zaragoza, Aragon, Spain
 Wadi Adventure in Al Ain, Abu Dhabi, United Arab Emirates — pumped

Under planning or construction

References

External links
 Hydrostadium, constructor of most Olympic whitewater courses.
 Wadi Adventure, UAE.